The 2019 British Academy Television Awards were held on 12 May 2019 at the Royal Festival Hall in London. The nominations were announced on 28 March 2019, whilst the nominees for the "Virgin TV’s Must-See Moments" were announced on 27 March 2019. The 2019 British Academy Television Craft Awards were held on 28 April 2019.

Winners and nominees

Programmes with multiple nominations
The following is a list of programmes with multiple nominations at both the 2019 British Academy Television Awards and the 2019 British Academy Television Craft Awards.

Most major wins

Ceremony Information
On 2 April 2019, it was announced that following a 2 year break, Graham Norton would return to host the 2019 BAFTA Television Awards.

Controversy
The inclusion of Killing Eve attracted some controversy as BAFTA rules state that a programme must have its premiere in the UK before elsewhere in order to be eligible, and Killing Eve premiered on BBC America in the US in April 2018, but in the UK in September 2018. BAFTA subsequently amended its eligibility rules, removing the requirement for UK programmes to premiere in the UK.

In Memoriam

Andre Previn
Jacqueline Pearce
Peter Armitage
Bill Sellars
Wendy Beckett
Magenta Devine
Clive Swift
Windsor Davies
Grant McKee
Sandy Ratcliff
Richard Baker
Chris Pye
Luke Perry
Leslie Grantham
Mya-Lecia Naylor
Ernest Maxin
Monica Sims
Jeremy Hardy
Anthony Owen
Denis Norden
Jill James
Ray Galton
Rachael Bland
John Bluthal
Peter Tork
Leonie Jameson
Bernard Hepton
June Whitfield

References

External links
Official website

2019
2019 awards in the United Kingdom
2019 in British television
May 2019 events in the United Kingdom
2019 television awards
Royal Festival Hall